Age of Booty is a real-time strategy video game developed by Certain Affinity and published by Capcom for the Xbox 360, PlayStation 3, and Microsoft Windows. Set in the swashbuckling era, the game puts the players in the control of a pirate ship with the goal of looting and capturing towns for a pirate faction, while defeating the enemy ships on the way.

Gameplay

Gameplay largely revolves around the maneuvering of a boat around a sea. The sea is made up of hexagons called Hexes. The player controls the boat by selecting a hex for a destination. If the ship becomes adjacent to a hex containing an enemy ship, merchant ship, town, or settlement, it will automatically attack it with cannon fire. Cannon damage depends on the number of upgrades, but if more than one enemy is adjacent, the ship will split its fire, firing at a different one each time. The objective is to capture a specific number of towns, which is given in mission briefing: the upper right corner of the screen displays the number cities owned, the ones owned by enemies, and the target number. The Pirate Lair can never be conquered by enemies, but the mission will end in failure if the enemies conquer the target number of towns before the player.

To capture a town the player must be adjacent to it and bombard it until it has no health left; the town will continue to fire on the ship until the health is depleted. A town upgrade applies on both town health and cannon power. When health is depleted a "capture" bar shows, and when full the town will be conquered. If an enemy ship nears the town, the "capture" will be paused until one of the ship sinks or flees. Towns automatically heal adjacent ships of the same party, so a defending party has an advantage.

Players control a 3D avatar of a pirate ship with colored sails depending on which team they are on. Ships have three attributes that can be upgraded: speed, armor, and cannon—each of which can be upgraded up to three times. Speed determines how fast the player's ship sails, armor measures the amount of damage the ship can take before it is destroyed, and cannon measures the damage the ship can cause. The Cannon attribute is displayed over the ship as small circles under the life gauge. Upgrading attack strength also decreases speed.

In the game, players use different resources to upgrade their towns and ships. There are three different resource types: gold, wood, and rum. 4 gold and 2 wood will upgrade a town, and 4 rum and 2 wood upgrade ships. Players can acquire resources by picking up boxes floating in the water, destroying enemy ships, plundering villages, using one of the four curses or capturing towns and using them to produce resources.  Each town/village displays the resources it will produce with icons floating over its avatar. The player ship can only be upgraded in the Pirate Lair, but a town can be upgraded regardless of ship position.

In the waters, merchant ships are frequently spawned, who attack any nearby ship, regardless of flag. While they do not have strong firepower nor hard hull, they release a curse crate when sunk. The player can only have one curse at a time, so if the crate is salvaged, it will give either a curse from 4 different types or a random resource. The four curses type are:
 Bomb: Heavily damages anything within a hex, must be placed on an empty water hex
 Whirlpool: Warps a ship to a random part of the map.
 Ghost Ship: Makes the player ship invisible until cannons are next fired
 Pilfer Monkey: Steals up to two resources of one type (Gold, Rum, or Wood) from an enemy depending on availability

There are 7 different challenges for solo play, each featuring 3 differing maps of easy, medium and hard difficulty levels for a total of 21 single player missions. Multiplayer has a four-player game (Dueling Duos), six player game (Triple Trouble) and an eight-player game (Four By Four), which is all divided into two teams. There is also Battle Royale pitting 4 teams of two players against each other. Players can use voice chat to talk with their team. Capcom has also added 6 additional maps for free to download on PSN. The XBLA version includes Avatar support.

Development

Designer Max Hoberman admitted that inspiration for the game, came from Bungie's long-running April Fools' Day gag Pimps at Sea. An open beta went live on September 19, 2008 (International Talk Like a Pirate Day).

On December 4, 2008, three additional map packs were released at no cost.

Reception

The Xbox 360 version of Age of Booty received "generally favorable reviews", while the PC and PlayStation 3 versions received "average" reviews, according to the review aggregation website Metacritic. Eurogamer said the game's single-player mode was "frustrating and poorly balanced", but added, "take it online and you've got something that's almost worth the 800-Point asking price." IT Reviews agreed, stating "It's cheaply priced and great fun to play online as the matches are quick and enjoyable, although the offline campaign is rather marred by the erratic computer AI."

The game was nominated for two Xbox Live Arcade 2008 awards: "Best Original Game" and "Best Competitive Multiplayer Game".

References

External links
 
 

2008 video games
Capcom games
Computer wargames
PlayStation Network games
Real-time strategy video games
Video games about pirates
Video games developed in the United States
Windows games
Xbox 360 Live Arcade games
Xbox 360 games
Certain Affinity games
Multiplayer and single-player video games